Messenger of Allah, known in Japan as  is a Japanese tokusatsu superhero TV series produced by Toei Company starring a young Sonny Chiba, at the time known as Shin'ichi Chiba. It was created by writer Yasunori Kawauchi, who was also responsible for creating Moonlight Mask and Seven Color Mask. The series ran from July 7, 1960 to December 27, 1960 on NET (now TV Asahi) for a total of 26 episodes.

Development
After New Seven Color Mask ended its run, Shin'ichi Chiba continued on to star in Yasunori Kawauchi's swashbuckler adventure Messenger of Allah. The series was inspired by creator Kawauchi's conversion to Islam in 1959.

The title character was the basis for Warrior of Love Rainbowman, which Kawauchi also created and wrote for, and also aired on NET. The film for the first episode is all that exists, which can be found on the Toei Tokusatsu BB website. Messenger of Allah was sponsored by the Kabaya Foods Corporation. The Kabayan Kingdom, His Imperial Highness Coconut and Mammy were named after the sponsor's products "Kabaya Caramel Coconut" and the "Mammy" brand bisquits from Morinaga & Company.

Story
The setting takes place in the fictional  in the Middle East. His Imperial Highness Coconut, the heir to the throne, and his sister Mammy are searching for hidden treasure, guided by a map. The Messenger of Allah's secret identity is Goro Narumi, a private investigator.

Cast
Shin'ichi Chiba: 
Kaneko Akio: , successor of the Kabayan Kingdom.
Yumi Ichijo: , Coconut's sister.
Hitoshi Ohmae: 
Junorio Kozuka: 
Arima Shinji: 
Etsuko Sakurai: 
Koji Matsuyama:

Episode list

Staff

Theme song
Opening: 
Lyrics: Yasunori Kawauchi
Composer: George M. Reed
Song: Toshiba Children's Chorus

Ending: 
Lyrics: Yasunori Kawauchi
Composer: George M. Reed
Song: Yuji Mine

Manga

The manga version by Ippei Kuri was serialized in Bōken Ō magazine, and the tankōbon was published in 2010.

Notes

Bibliography

References

1960 Japanese television series debuts
1960 Japanese television series endings
1960s Japanese television series
TV Asahi original programming
Toei tokusatsu
Transforming heroes
Television series set in fictional countries
Television series set in the Middle East